Insectes sociaux is a scientific journal dedicated to the study of social insects. It is the official journal of the International Union for the Study of Social Insects (IUSSI), and is published by Birkhäuser Verlag.

References

External links

Entomology journals and magazines
Academic journals associated with international learned and professional societies
Springer Science+Business Media academic journals